Graeme Butte Nicolson (born January 13, 1958 in North Bay, Ontario) is a former NHL defenceman. He played for the Boston Bruins, Colorado Rockies, and New York Rangers.

As of 2008, he works in Lakefield, Ontario as a veterinarian.

Championships
He won the 1983-84 CHL Championship (Adams Cup) as a member of the Tulsa Oilers  team coached by Tom Webster.

Career statistics

Regular season and playoffs

References

External links
 

1958 births
Living people
Binghamton Dusters players
Binghamton Whalers players
Boston Bruins draft picks
Boston Bruins players
Canadian expatriate ice hockey players in the United States
Canadian ice hockey defencemen
Colorado Rockies (NHL) players
Cornwall Royals players
Fort Worth Texans players
Ice hockey people from Ontario
New York Rangers players
Rochester Americans players
Sportspeople from North Bay, Ontario
Tulsa Oilers (1964–1984) players